Chinkara Breeding Centre, Kairu is a protected Chinkara breeding centre in Kairu village, Tosham tehsil, Bhiwani district, Haryana, India. The Ch. Surender Singh Memorial Herbal Park, Kairu is nearby.

Description
The centre started in 1985 with 10 animals, and  had 66 animals (22 males, 44 female and two young). Here the animals are fed twice a day (morning and evening).

Today it is an exceptional tourist attraction, because on 60 hectares they can see the diversity of flora and fauna.

Transport
The village of Kairu can be reached via road using the state transport service or private bus services. The closest railway station is at Bhiwani.

See also
 List of zoos in India
 List of National Parks & Wildlife Sanctuaries of Haryana, India
 Haryana Tourism

References

Bhiwani district
Protected areas of Haryana
Animal breeding organisations in India
Organisations based in Haryana
1985 establishments in Haryana
Protected areas established in 1985